Green October Event 2019 was the 5th edition of Green October Event held on 1 October 2019 at Oriental Hotel, Victoria Island, Lagos, Nigeria.

create awareness and appreciate and support persons living with disabilities.

Lilian Esoro and Chinonso Arubayi hosted the fifth edition of the event. It was focused on creating awareness, appreciating and supporting people living with disabilities.

Award recipients
The fifth edition of Green October Event was held on 1 October 2019 at Oriental Hotel, Victoria Island, Lagos, Nigeria.

Humanitarian and fashion awards
Glitz and Glamour Wigs- Luxury Hair Brand of the Year
All Bellaz- Accessories Designer of the Year
Ariyike Akinbobola- Inspiring Humanitarian of the Year
Leo DaSilva- Humanitarian Icon of the Year
Princess Agunbiade- Humanitarian Pacesetter of the Year
Kachi Beauty Products- Business Entrepreneur Pacesetter of the Year
Sophie Couture Boutique- Fashion Retail Store of the Year
Layole Oyatogun- Most Fashionable Female Celebrity of the Year
Aderinola Odugbesan-Thomas- Fashion Influencer of the Year
Yemi Disu- Inspiring Entrepreneur of the Year
Chioma Ikokwu- All Round Entrepreneur of the Year
Funke Soyibo- Entrepreneur of the Year
Wonder Child For Kids- Outstanding Kids Brand of the Year
Medlin Boss- Outstanding Entrepreneur of the Year
Bibisquintessence- Women's Wear Designer of the Year
Uniq Couture- Creative Fashion Designer of the Year
Kam Kiddies- Kids Fashion Designer of the Year
Funke Famoroti Araoluwanim- Humanitarian of the Year
Darling Nigeria- Beauty Brand of the Year
Adeoye-Adeniji Temitope Fowowe- Outstanding Entrepreneur of the Year
Valisimo Fashion Academy- Fashion Academy of the Year
Aduke Ade- Distinguished Entrepreneur of the Year
Tosin Ayo-Ishola- All Round humanitarian of the Year
Visible Proof Fashion House- Men's Wear Designer of the Year
Imoh Eboh- Humanitarian Personality of the Year
Sayaveth Interiors- Luxury Brand of the Year
Mimi Orjiekwe- Celebrity Entrepreneur of the Year
Most Fashionable Male Celebrity of the Year- Tobi Bakare
Jbronze Hair- Most Outstanding Hair Brand of the Year
Halima Abubakar- Outstanding Celebrity Humanitarian of the Year
Obis Oragwu- Social Media Brand Influencer of the Year
Glee Luxury Hair- Hair Brand of the Year
St Margaret Couture- Fashion Designer of the Year
Vugo24- Makeup Artist of the Year
Ericamoore Brand- Enterprising Fashion Entrepreneur of the Year
EE-Jay Fashion- Fashion Entrepreneur of the Year
Olive Emodi- Humanitarian Celebrity of the Year
Medlin Boss- Fashion Stylist of the Year
Inyang Otu Foundation- Inspiring Foundation of the Year
Style Temple- Fashion Brand of the Year
O'Tra by Becca- Bridal Fashion Designer of the Year
Linda Osifo- Fashionable Personality of the Year
Pimp My Hair- Beauty Hair Stylist of the Year
Anthonia Ojieh- Beauty Entrepreneur of the Year
Bhomsy Stitches- Most Versatile Fashion Designer of the Year
Cynthia Nwadiora- Inspiring Brand Influencer of the Year
Taos Beauty Brand- Cosmetics Beauty Brand of the Year
Kika Osunde- Outstanding Beauty Entrepreneur of the Year

Recognition awards
Ado-Imosili Odion Christian- Stage and Set Designer of the Year
Clara Chizoba Kronborg- Humanitarian Award for Humanitarian Contribution to Society
Chioma Ikokwu- Humanitarian Award for Humanitarian Contribution to Society
Toyin Lawani- Humanitarian Award for Humanitarian Contribution to Society
Aderonke Tiamiyu- Entertainment Award for Contribution to the Entertainment Industry
Anja Ringgren Loven- Humanitarian Award for Humanitarian Contribution to Society
Ndubisi Ike- Creative Award for Contribution to the Fashion and Beauty Industry
Ifiokobong Anthony Akan- Humanitarian Award for Humanitarian Contribution to Society
Richard Mofe-Damijo- Lifetime Achievement Award for Contribution to the Entertainment Industry
Queen Disu- Fashion and Beauty Award for Contribution to the Fashion and Beauty Industry
Kate Henshaw- Excellence Award for Contribution to the Entertainment Industry
Nkechi Harry Ngonadi- Humanitarian Award for Humanitarian Contribution to Society
Oghenekaro Ekewenu- Humanitarian Man of the Year
St. PetersBell Jigo- Humanitarian Award for Significant Contribution to Humanity
Zynnelle Lydia- Entertainment Award for Contribution to the Entertainment Industry
Pamela Bello-Olatunji- Beauty Award for Tremendous Contribution to the Beauty Industry
Bibi Christophers- Fashion Award for Contribution to the Fashion Industry
Lisa Omorodion- Entertainment Award for Contribution to the Entertainment Industry
Tonya Lawani- Entrepreneur Personality of the Year
Lagos State Signage and Advertisement Agency- Excellence Award for Contribution to the Entertainment and Fashion Industry
Tana Egbo-Adelana- Humanitarian Award for Humanitarian Contribution to Society
KBK Foundation- Humanitarian Award for Humanitarian Contribution to Society
Fabulousitee Nigeria- Event Management Company of the Year
Sandra Thomas- Humanitarian Award for your Humanitarian Contribution to Society
Omobolanle Victor Laniyan- Excellence Award for Contribution to Sustainable Development
Nancy Isime- Humanitarian Award for Humanitarian Contribution to Society
Claudette Efionayi Emwanta- Humanitarian Award for Humanitarian Contribution to Society
Okonkwo Christabel Onyinyechi- Excellence Award for Attaining the Overall Highest Number of Votes for the 2019 Nomination Awards

References

Nigerian awards
Business and industry awards
Awards for contributions to society
Humanitarian and service awards